Orthaga disparoidalis is a species of snout moth in the genus Orthaga. It is found in China.

References

Moths described in 1925
Epipaschiinae
Endemic fauna of China